Macrocoma millingeni is a species of leaf beetle of the Arabian Peninsula and Mesopotamia, described by Maurice Pic in 1898.

References

millingeni
Beetles of Asia
Insects of the Arabian Peninsula
Beetles described in 1898
Taxa named by Maurice Pic
Insects of Western Asia